Hans Mierendorff (born Johannes Reingold Mierendorff; 30 June 1882 – 26 December 1955) was a German stage and film actor.

Selected filmography

 A Night of Horror (1916)
 Vengeance Is Mine (1916)
 Hilde Warren und der Tod (1917)
The Sacrifice (1918)
 The Mistress of the World (1919)
 Whitechapel (1920)
 Hearts are Trumps (1920)
 The White Peacock (1920)
 Night and No Morning (1921)
 The Conspiracy in Genoa (1921)
 Children of Darkness (1921)
 The Sleeping Volcano (1922)
 The Black Star (1922)
 Man Against Man (1924)
 Girls You Don't Marry (1924)
 The Enchantress (1924)
 Debit and Credit (1924)
 The Second Mother (1925)
 The Motorist Bride (1925)
 Old Mamsell's Secret (1925)
 Hussar Fever (1925)
 Cock of the Roost (1925)
 Oh Those Glorious Old Student Days (1925)
 The Man Who Sold Himself (1925)
 The Dealer from Amsterdam (1925)
 The Humble Man and the Chanteuse (1925)
 State Attorney Jordan (1926)
 The Circus of Life (1926)
 Watch on the Rhine (1926)
 Love's Joys and Woes (1926)
 Wrath of the Seas (1926)
 Our Daily Bread (1926)
 The Good Reputation (1926)
 Bigamie (1927)
 Attorney for the Heart (1927)
 Benno Stehkragen (1927)
 Circle of Lovers (1927)
 U-9 Weddigen (1927)
 Eva and the Grasshopper (1927)
 The Dashing Archduke (1927)
 Queen Louise (1927–28)
 The False Prince (1927)
 Cry for Help (1928)
 Mary Lou (1928)
 The Criminal of the Century (1928)
 Endangered Girls (1928)
 The Sinner (1928)
 It's You I Have Loved (1929)
 The Virgin of Paris (1930)
 Marriage in Name Only (1930)
 The Caviar Princess (1930)
 The Land of Smiles (1930)
 Namensheirat (1930)
 The Dancer of Sanssouci (1932)
 The Higher Command (1935)
 The Valiant Navigator (1935)
 Napoleon Is to Blame for Everything (1938)
 Water for Canitoga (1939)
 The Fox of Glenarvon (1940)
 Carl Peters (1941)
 Weiße Wäsche (1942)
 The Big Shadow (1942)

Bibliography
 Kreimeier, Klaus. The Ufa story: a history of Germany's greatest film company, 1918-1945. University of California Press, 1999.
 St. Pierre, Paul Matthew. E.A. Dupont and his Contribution to British Film: Varieté, Moulin Rouge, Piccadilly, Atlantic, Two Worlds, Cape Forlorn. Fairleigh Dickinson University Press, 2010.

External links

1882 births
1955 deaths
German male film actors
German male silent film actors
German male stage actors
People from Rostock
20th-century German male actors